Zebina paivensis is a species of minute sea snail, a marine gastropod mollusk or micromollusk in the family Zebinidae.

Description
The size of the shell varies between 2 mm and 6.5 mm.

Distribution
This species occurs in the Atlantic Ocean off the Canary Islands, Madeira and Selvagens.

References

 Gofas, S.; Le Renard, J.; Bouchet, P. (2001). Mollusca, in: Costello, M.J. et al. (Ed.) (2001). European register of marine species: a check-list of the marine species in Europe and a bibliography of guides to their identification. Collection Patrimoines Naturels, 50: pp. 180–213

External links
 

paivensis
Gastropods described in 1873
Molluscs of the Canary Islands
Molluscs of Madeira